The Last Journey is a 1936 British drama film directed by Bernard Vorhaus and starring Godfrey Tearle, Hugh Williams and Judy Gunn.

Synopsis
A train driver (Julien Mitchell) on his last journey before retirement thinks his fireman is having an affair with his wife.  The driver intends to kill himself and his passengers by crashing the train.  The train is filled with colourful characters, including a psychoanalyst who persuades the driver not to do it.

Cast
 Godfrey Tearle as Sir Wilfred Rhodes
 Hugh Williams as Gerald Winter
 Judy Gunn as Diana Gregory
 Mickey Brantford as Tom
 Julien Mitchell as Bob Holt
 Olga Lindo as Mrs. Holt
 Michael Hogan as Charlie
 Frank Pettingell as Goddard
 Eliot Makeham as Pip
 Eve Gray as Daisy

Production
The film was made at Twickenham Studios and is considered a quota quickie.

Critical reception
The New York Times wrote, "there are some engaging directorial touches, and there is some excellent photography" ; and Britmovie noted a "gripping low-budget b-movie portmanteau thriller featuring fast-cutting from director Bernard Vorhaus and impressive location shooting on the Great Western Railway."

References

Bibliography
 Richards, Jeffrey (ed.). The Unknown 1930s: An Alternative History of the British Cinema, 1929- 1939. I.B. Tauris & Co, 1998.

External links

1936 films
British black-and-white films
1936 crime drama films
British crime drama films
Films directed by Bernard Vorhaus
Films shot at Twickenham Film Studios
Films set in London
Films set on trains
1930s English-language films
1930s British films